Beginning of the Enz is a compilation album by New Zealand rock group Split Enz. Released in the UK by Chrysalis Records, it compiles tracks from the albums Second Thoughts (1976) and Dizrythmia (1977), as well as the non-album single "Another Great Divide" (1977). Despite its almost identical title, the album bares a completely different track listing to the 1979 Split Enz album The Beginning of the Enz, which comprised non-album singles and demos from 1973 to 1974.

Track listing
 "My Mistake" 	from Dizrythmia, 1977 (Finn, Rayner) 	2:58
 "Crosswords" 	from Dizrythmia, 1977 (Finn) 3:23
 "Bold as Brass" 	from Dizrythmia, 1977 (Finn, Gillies) 3:27
 "Another Great Divide" single, 1977 (Finn, Gillies, Judd, Rayner) 3:38
 "Charley" from Dizrythmia, 1977 (Finn) 5:28
 "Late Last Night" from Second Thoughts, 1976 (Judd) 4:02
 "Stranger Than Fiction" from Second Thoughts, 1976 (Finn, Judd) 7:06
 "Time for a Change" from Second Thoughts, 1976 (Judd) 4:02
 "Walking Down a Road" from Second Thoughts, 1976 (Finn, Judd) 5:24

Personnel
Split Enz

Second Thoughts and "Another Great Divide"
Tim Finn – Vocals, Piano
Phil Judd – Vocals, Guitar
Mike Chunn – Bass
Eddie Rayner – Keyboards
Emlyn Crowther – Drums
Noel Crombie – Percussion
Rob Gillies – Saxophone, Trumpet 
Dizrythmia
Tim Finn – Vocals, Piano
Eddie Rayner – Keyboards
Noel Crombie – Percussion
Rob Gillies – Saxophone, Trumpet 
Malcolm Green – Drums
Neil Finn – Vocals, Guitar
Nigel Griggs – Bass

References

1980 compilation albums
Split Enz compilation albums